Gander Automated Air Traffic System (GAATS) is a proprietary system of Nav Canada used for the oceanic airspace of the Gander Area Control Centre (ACC).

Most of the airspace is not monitored by radar, so procedures differ from those in continental airspaces. GAATS is an oceanic air traffic management system that automatically processes flight data and provides air traffic controllers with a radar-like picture of traffic in oceanic airspace. GAATS also provides automatic waypoint reports, and use of Controller Pilot Data Link Communications (CPDLC) which is text-based messaging for such routine requests as altitude changes. GAATS brings significant safety and efficiency benefits to North Atlantic airspace.

North Atlantic airspace is the busiest oceanic airspace in the world with about 1,300 flights a day, most of which are large commercial carriers. More than half the flights follow the North Atlantic Tracks but about 40% are 'random', with flight plans not on tracks, such as search/rescue and others. Nav Canada shares control of this airspace with its United Kingdom counterpart, the National Air Traffic Services (NATS).

The GAATS technology is now used by NATS’ Shanwick Oceanic Control with Nav Canada and the UK ANS provider collaborating on flight management for the whole of North Atlantic airspace.

The Gander ACC ("Gander Centre", CZQX) is responsible for controlling aircraft in the western half of the North Atlantic oceanic airspace. The Gander oceanic airspace is bounded to the north by the Icelandic Control Center, on the east by the Prestwick, Scotland, control centre, to the south by the Portuguese control centre in the Azores, and finally to the southwest by the New York Air Route Traffic Control Center.

GAATS traffic management capabilities are achieved through the tight integration between air traffic, airspace and weather models. Operational flexibility and workload balancing are further enhanced through dynamic sectorization.

Specifically, GAATS gives controllers increased situational awareness by having on-screen access to data from a variety of sources, as well as a visual display of the aircraft positions, much as a radar controller would. Among the many features available, controllers can use this new computing and display power to view projected routes and their timelines, and to help avoid potential conflicts.

References 
 GAATS Brochure
 ARINC waypoint communications
 ATC Technology over the North Atlantic

Air traffic control systems